Parevander xanthomelas is a species of beetle in the family Cerambycidae. It was described by Félix Édouard Guérin-Méneville in 1844, and has been classified in the genus Parevander since the circumscription of that genus by Per Olof Christopher Aurivillius in 1912.

Range

Its type locality was described as "the interior of Mexico"; Auguste Sallé and Edward Palmer later obtained specimens in Izúcar, Puebla and Monclova, Coahuila, respectively. It's also been observed in the state of Jalisco in both San Buenaventura and in Chamela. as well as in the states of Chiapas, Morelos, Guerrero, and Oaxaca. Earle Gorton Linsley reported the species was "rather common in Southern and Central Mexico."

In Guatemala, it was found in Morazán, El Progreso by George Charles Champion. Its habitat also includes Guanacaste, Costa Rica. Its range in Honduras includes the Francisco Morazán Department. In Texas, it has been found in Hidalgo and Starr Counties in the Rio Grande Valley. George Henry Horn noted there were specimens in the Jardin des plantes which were collected in Southern California.

Relationship with plants

It has been observed on flowers of Viguiera stenoloba, Tithonia sp., Tithonia rotundifolia, Cosmos sulphureus, Viguiera dentata, and Montanoa sp. Its larvae eat the roots of Lantana camara. In 1902, there was an unsuccessful attempt to use P. xanthomelas as a biological control agent to combat L. camara in Hawaii, where it's an invasive species. It is not established in Hawaii.

Notes

References

Further reading

 
 
 
 
 
 
 

Trachyderini
Beetles described in 1844
Taxa named by Félix Édouard Guérin-Méneville
Beetles of Central America
Insects of Mexico
Beetles of the United States
Fauna of California
Fauna of the Rio Grande valleys
Natural history of Texas
Biological pest control beetles